Red Rings of Fear is a 1978 giallo film directed by Alberto Negrin.

Plot    
A detective investigates the killing of a teenage girl and turns his suspicions on three girlfriends of the victim, who dub themselves "The Inseparables."

Production
Red Rings of Fear is the third entry in a loosely linked series of film called the Schoolgirls in Peril trilogy, a series of films based on the sexual exploits of young girls and their reaction to the adults. By 1974, audiences began to grow tired of the giallo genre and began having interest in other European genres such as the poliziotteschi, urban cop thrillers that were influenced by American films such as Dirty Harry and The French Connection. Dallamano's second film in the Schoolgirls in Peril trilogy was What Have They Done to Your Daughters?, a film with similar themes to the first film What Have You Done to Solange?. Red Rings of Fear has Dallamano credited as a screenwriter on the film, and was intended to direct the film, but he died before the film began production.

Cast 

 Fabio Testi: Inspector Di Salvo
 Christine Kaufmann: Christina
 Ivan Desny: Inspector Roccaglio 
 Jack Taylor: Parravicino 
 Fausta Avelli: Emilia 
 Helga Liné: Miss Russo

Release
Red Rings of Fear was released in Italy on 19 August 1978.

Reception
In a contemporary review, Paul Taylor (Monthly Film Bulletin) gave the film a negative review, calling it "a wholly inane and incoherent thriller, which scarcely seems to have benefited form the attentions of no less than six credited screenwriters." and that it featured a  "bored-looking Fabio Testi, when not shooting gratuitous fill-ins (schoolgirls in the showers; an abortion sequence) from silly angles, Negrin peppers the proceedings with would-be enigmatic close-ups of car radiator grilles, a madonna statue and a watching eye, plus titillating flashbacks to the fatal party"

References

Works cited

External links

Red Rings of Fear at Variety Distribution

1978 films
1970s crime thriller films
Giallo films
Spanish crime thriller films
West German films
Films directed by Alberto Negrin
Films scored by Riz Ortolani
Films set in Italy
1970s Italian films